Thomas Morrice was an English politician in the 17th century.

Morris was elected to the Cavalier Parliament and became Commissioner for Loyal and Indigent Officers in 1662. He died on 27 May 1675 and was buried at Westminster Abbey on 1 June that year.

References

1675 deaths
English MPs 1661–1679
17th-century English people
People from Westminster